William David Holland (June 4, 1915 – April 5, 1997) was a relief pitcher in Major League Baseball who played for the Washington Senators during the 1939 season. Listed at 6'1", 190 lb., he batted and threw left-handed. He was born in Varina, North Carolina and died in Goldsboro, North Carolina.

Holland posted a 0-1 record with two strikeouts and an 11.25 ERA in 4.0 innings pitched.

External links

Washington Senators (1901–1960) players
Major League Baseball pitchers
Baseball players from North Carolina
1915 births
1997 deaths
People from Fuquay-Varina, North Carolina